Euchilichthys is a genus of upside-down catfishes native to the Congo River Basin in Middle Africa.

Species
There are currently five recognized species in this genus:
 Euchilichthys astatodon (Pellegrin, 1928)
 Euchilichthys boulengeri Nichols & La Monte, 1934
 Euchilichthys dybowskii (Vaillant, 1892)
 Euchilichthys guentheri (Schilthuis, 1891)
 Euchilichthys royauxi Boulenger, 1902

Description 
Euchilichthys species have the lips and part of the barbels modified into a suckermouth.

References

Mochokidae
Catfish of Africa
Freshwater fish genera
Catfish genera
Taxa named by George Albert Boulenger